The Archbishop of Southwark (Br  [ˈsʌðɨk]) is the Ordinary of the Roman Catholic Archdiocese of Southwark in England. As such he is the Metropolitan Archbishop of the Province of Southwark.

The Metropolitan See is in Southwark where the archbishop's seat is located at the Metropolitan Cathedral Church of Saint George.

The eleventh and current archbishop of Southwark is John Wilson, who was appointed by the Holy See on 10 June 2019 and was installed at St George's Cathedral, Southwark, on 25 July 2019.

History
The Diocese of Southwark was created on 29 September 1850 and originally covered the historic counties of Surrey, Berkshire, Hampshire, Kent, Sussex, the Isle of Wight, and the Channel Islands. It lost territory on the creation of the Diocese of Portsmouth on 19 May 1882. The diocese lost further territory on the creation of the Diocese of Arundel & Brighton on 28 May 1965. However, on the same day the diocese of Southwark was elevated to an archdiocese when the Ecclesiastical province of Southwark was established; from 1850 the diocese had been part of the Province of Westminster. The metropolitan archbishop of Southwark has jurisdiction over the bishops of Arundel & Brighton, of Plymouth, and of Portsmouth.

List of bishops and archbishops

Bishops of Southwark

Archbishops of Southwark

See also
Catholic Church in England and Wales

References

Bibliography

 

 
Roman Catholic Archdiocese of Southwark